The following is a list of public holidays in Romania. According to Romanian law, Romania had 51 public holidays as of 2011, which cover 14% of the days of the year in the country.

Official non-working holidays

Other working holidays and observances

Traditional holidays – working observances

See also
Public holidays in Moldova
Public holidays in Transnistria

References

External links
Public holidays in Romania
List of public holidays in Romania  

 
Romania
Romanian culture
Society of Romania
Observances in Romania
Holidays